Liam Stapleton is an Australian radio presenter and comedian.

He co-hosts Ben, Liam & Belle on Nova 100 with Ben Harvey and Belle Jackson.

Early life 
Stapleton grew up in the suburbs of Adelaide.

Career 
Stapleton began his radio career aged 14 years old at the Adelaide community radio station Fresh 92.7, where he met Ben Harvey. As a duo, "Ben & Liam" went on to present the breakfast show for Fresh 92.7, compete in the state finals of Raw Comedy, and host a comedy show at the Adelaide Fringe Festival.

In late 2016, Harvey and Stapleton were confirmed to take over from Matt Okine and Alex Dyson as co-hosts of the nationwide Triple J Breakfast show in 2017. They were signed on for another year in the role in 2018.

References 

Living people
People from Adelaide
Australian male comedians
Triple J announcers
Year of birth missing (living people)